The 2000 season was the Carolina Panthers' sixth in the National Football League (NFL) and their second under head coach George Seifert. They failed to improve upon their 8–8 record in 1999 and make it to the playoffs for the second time in franchise history, dropping by one game from 8–8 to 7–9, however, the Panthers finished third in the division, behind the playoff-bound St. Louis Rams and New Orleans Saints. For the first time since 1985, DE Reggie White failed to reach the Pro Bowl.

Offseason

NFL Draft

The 2000 NFL Draft took place at Radio City Music Hall in New York City on April 15 and April 16, 2000. The Panthers selected seven players in seven rounds.

Undrafted free agents

Staff

Roster

Schedule

Preseason

Regular season

Standings

References

Carolina Panthers seasons
Carolina Panthers
Carolina